Tui Lau is a Fijian chiefly title of recent history which was created during the time of Ma'afu and his conquests.

A Brief History
Ma'afu was disclaimed as a Tongan Prince by his cousin King George Tupou I. Since the Vuanirewa Clan of the Lau Islands considered Ma'afu as their own, they therefore installed him as the first Tui Lau.

The title was later revived in 1938 by the Yavusa Tonga Clan and installed Ratu Sir Lala Sukuna upon the approval and support of the Tui Nayau, Ratu Tevita Uluiilakeba.

Ratu Kamisese Mara, the son of Ratu Tevita Uluilakeba, was the last to be installed to the title of Tui Lau. In March 2023 the position was offered to his son, Tevita Mara.

The Installation
The title of Tui Lau is decided by the Yavusa Tonga of Sawana.

Recent history
There has been no installation since Ratu Sir Kamisese Mara's time. The current candidates for the title include his eldest living son, Ratu Finau Mara.

Tui Lau Chart of title holders

See also
Enele Ma'afu
Kamisese Mara
Lala Sukuna

Notes 

 
Tui Lau